Chaingang (sometimes listed as CHAINGANG) are a female-fronted punk/rock band from Sydney, Australia.

Biography

Chaingang formed in 2007 following the dissolution of Hayley Foster and Mike Jeffery's former band Pinky Tuscadero on New Year's Eve 2006. Cultivating a rapt cult following across Sydney, the band first came to widespread attention when they were personally chosen by US band Panic! at the Disco to support them during their 2008 Australian tour.

A demo version of one of their first tracks, Get Off My Stage, attracted widespread attention via tastemaking music blogs across the UK, US and Australia, and saw the band selected by national youth broadcaster Triple J as an Unearthed Feature Artist in 2008.

Chaingang have since played with the likes of Cold War Kids, The Streets, Crystal Castles, Ladyhawke, The Grates, Bluejuice, Peaches' band Sweet Machine, Operator Please, and opened for George Michael at the official 2010 Sydney Mardi Gras party. The band were also finalists in MTV's Kickstart initiative.

Chaingang recently completed a national tour with Operator Please and Tim and Jean, and are set to play the Big Day Out festival in January 2011.

Debut release
Chaingang recorded an EP in Nashville with producer Sean Ray aka Snob Scrilla, but the project was scrapped. A new EP is scheduled for release in 2011.

Discography

Singles
 2010: Holiday
 2011: Crazy

Extended plays
 2011: Chaingang (TBA)

References

External links
Official Chaingang MySpace
Chaingang profile on Triple J Unearthed
YouTube link to official video clip for 'Holiday' single
YouTube link to 2009 footage of Chaingang performing their song 'Holiday'

New South Wales musical groups
Australian rock music groups
Musical groups established in 2007